Christian Aniadas Araneta (born 16 March 1995) is a Filipino professional boxer.

Boxing career
Araneta made his professional debut against Garry Rojo on 7 September 2013. He won the fight by a third-round knockout. Araneta amassed a 13–0 record during the next three years, before facing Demsi Manufoe for vacant WBO Oriental light flyweight title, his first major regional title, on 18 March 2017. He won the fight by a first-round knockout. After capturing his first major regional title, Araneta faced Ian Ligutan in a stay-busy fight on 3 April 2018. He won the fight by knockout, 45 seconds into the second round.

Araneta faced Jerry Tomogdan for the vacant WBC-ABC Silver light flyweight title on 18 August 2018. He won the fight by a late twelfth-round stoppage, knocking Tomogdan out with just two seconds remaining in the round. Araneta was next booked to face Vincent Bautista on 22 December 2018. He won the fight by unanimous decision, with scores of 80–72, 79–73 and 79–73.

His 17–0 record earned Araneta the opportunity to face Daniel Valladares in an IBF light flyweight title eliminator on 7 September 2019, at the Arena José Sulaimán in Monterrey, Mexico, in his first fight outside of the Philippines. He retired from the bout at the end of the fourth round, citing an injury to his right shoulder.

After suffering the first loss of his professional career, Araneta was scheduled to face Richard Rosales on 7 October 2020, following a thirteen-month absence from the sport. He won the fight by unanimous decision, with scores of 99–89, 100–88 and 99–98. Araneta next faced Roland Jay Biendima on 18 December 2020. He won the fight by a first-round knockout.

Araneta was booked to face Sivenathi Nontshinga in an IBF light flyweight title eliminator on 24 April 2021, at the Boardwalk Casino in Gqeberha, South Africa, in what was only his second fight outside of the Philippines. He lost the fight by unanimous decision, with two judges scoring the bout 114–113 for Nontshinga, while the third judge awarded him a 115–112 scorecard. Araneta scored the sole knockdown of the fight in the twelfth round, dropping his opponent with a straight left.

Following his second professional loss, Araneta was scheduled to face Richard Claveras on 16 July 2021. He made quick work of his opponent, forcing a corner stoppage at the 1:51 minute mark of the opening round. Araneta faced Arnold Garde on 22 October 2021, in his final fight of the year. He once again won by a first-round stoppage.

Araneta faced the one-time WBA mini-flyweight title challenger Toto Landero at Kumbati 13 on June 17, 2022.

Professional boxing record

References

1995 births
Living people
Filipino male boxers
Light-flyweight boxers
Sportspeople from Cebu
Southpaw boxers